In graph theory, the weak components of a directed graph partition the vertices of the graph into subsets that are totally ordered by reachability. They form the finest partition of the set of vertices that is totally ordered in this way.

Definition
The weak components were defined in a 1972 paper by Ronald Graham, Donald Knuth, and (posthumously) Theodore Motzkin, by analogy to the strongly connected components of a directed graph, which form the finest possible partition of the graph's vertices into subsets that are partially ordered by reachability. Instead, they defined the weak components to be the finest partition of the vertices into subsets that are totally ordered by 

In more detail,  defines the weak components through a combination of four symmetric relations on the vertices of any directed graph, denoted here as     
As with any equivalence relation, it can be used to partition the vertices of the graph into equivalence classes, subsets of the vertices such that two vertices are related by  if and only if they belong to the same equivalence class. These equivalence classes are the weak components of the given 

The original definition by Graham, Knuth, and Motzkin is equivalent but formulated somewhat differently.

Corresponding to these definitions, a directed graph is called weakly connected if it has exactly one weak component. This means that its vertices cannot be partitioned into two subsets, such that all of the vertices in the first subset can reach all of the vertices in the second subset, but such that none of the vertices in the second subset can reach any of the vertices in the first subset. It differs from other notions of weak connectivity in the literature, such as connectivity and components in the underlying unconnected graph, for which Knuth suggests the alternative terminology

Properties
Therefore, we can define an ordering on the weak components, according to which  when all vertices in  can reach all vertices  By definition,  This is an asymmetric relation (two elements can only be related in one direction, not the other) and it inherits the property of being a transitive relation from the transitivity of reachability. Therefore, it defines a total ordering on the weak components. It is the finest possible partition of the vertices into a totally ordered set of vertices consistent with 

This ordering on the weak components can alternatively be interpreted as a weak ordering on the vertices themselves, with the property that when  in the weak ordering, there necessarily exists a path from   but not from   However, this is not a complete characterization of this weak ordering, because two vertices  and  could have this same reachability ordering while belonging to the same weak component as each 

Algorithms
The algorithm for weak components generates the strongly connected components in this order, and maintains a partition of the components that have been generated so far into the weak components of their induced subgraph. After all components are generated, this partition will describe the weak components of the whole 

It is convenient to maintain the current partition into weak components in a stack, with each weak component maintaining additionally a list of its , strongly connected components that have no incoming edges from other strongly connected components in the same weak component, with the most recently generated source first. Each newly generated strongly connected component may form a new weak component on its own, or may end up merged with some of the previously constructed weak components near the top of the stack, the ones for which it cannot reach all 

Thus, the algorithm performs the following 
Initialize an empty stack of weak components, each associated with a list of its source components.
Use Tarjan's strongly connected components algorithm to generate the strongly connected components of the given graph in the reverse of a topological order. When each strongly connected component  is generated, perform the following steps with it:
While the stack is non-empty and  has no edges to the top weak component of the stack, pop that component from the stack.
If the stack is still non-empty, and some sources of its top weak component are not hit by edges  again pop that component from the stack.
Construct a new weak  containing as sources  and all of the unhit sources from the top component that was popped, and push  onto the stack.

References

Graph connectivity
Graph theory objects